Fidai Khan (born Mirza Hedayetullah, reigned: 1627–1628) was the subahdar of Bengal Subah during the reign of emperor Jahangir.

History
Khan held the post of Mir Bahr-i-Nawarah (Admiral of the Fleet) of the Mughals. After the death of Mukarram Khan, he was appointed subahdar of Bengal in 1627. But he ruled Bengal for about a year. Soon after the death of emperor Jahangir, he was replaced by Qasim Khan Juvayni.

References

Subahdars of Bengal
Place of birth unknown
Date of birth unknown
Place of death unknown
Date of death unknown